Konyaaltı Beach is one of the two main beaches of Antalya, the other being Lara Beach.

The beach is located on the western side of the city and stretches for 13 km primarily composed of fine pebbles, but also has some sand. The water is beautifully clear. Konyaaltı Beach has "Blue Flag" status, which confirms the good water quality. It is bound inwards by the beach park and numerous bars, cafes, nightclubs and hotels. The 'Aqualand' waterpark along Dumlupınar Bulvarı is the other border.

Facilities
The beach is patrolled by Life guards. The free of charge changing rooms and the showers are available for all visitors on the beach.

Flora
The Turkish pine and shrubs of hibiscus grow along the beachfront.

References

Antalya
Beaches of Turkey
Tourist attractions in Antalya
Landforms of Antalya Province